Kalbach is a municipality in the district of Fulda, in Hesse, Germany.

Kalbach may also refer to:

Kalbach (Nidda), a river of Hesse, Germany, tributary of the Nidda
Kalbach-Riedberg, a district of Frankfurt am Main, Germany, formed of Kalbach and Riedberg

See also
Herbert W. Kalmbach